Chak Gajiwal  is a village in Kapurthala district of Punjab State, India. The village is administrated by a Sarpanch, who is an elected representative.

Demography 
According to the report published by Census India in 2011, Chak Gajiwal has a total number of 6 houses and population of 30 of which include 16 males and 14 females. Literacy rate of Chak Gajiwal is 85.19%, higher than state average of 75.84%.  The population of children under the age of 6 years is 3 which is 10.00% of total population of Chak Gajiwal, and child sex ratio is approximately  0, lower than state average of 846.

Population data

Air travel connectivity 
The closest airport to the village is Sri Guru Ram Dass Jee International Airport.

Villages in Kapurthala

External links
  Villages in Kapurthala
 Kapurthala Villages List

References

Villages in Kapurthala district